In France, the concours Advance is a competitive examination to access to four main engineering grandes écoles:

 École pour l'informatique et les techniques avancées for computer science and software engineering ;
 ESME-Sudria for energy ;
 Institut polytechnique des sciences avancées for aeronautical and aerospace engineering.
 Institut Sup'Biotech de Paris for biotechnology.

History 
The examination has been created in 2011 by IONIS Education Group. Sup’Biotech joined it in 2016.

Campuses 
The students can choose between 13 campuses located in the cities of Lille, Ivry-sur-Seine, Le Kremlin-Bicêtre, Paris, Bordeaux, Toulouse, Lyon, Rennes and Strasbourg.

References

External links 
 Official website

Engineering universities and colleges in France
Grandes écoles